Ptyssoptera tryphera is a moth of the family Palaephatidae. It is found in the Australian Capital Territory, New South Wales and Queensland.

The larvae feed between silk-joined leaves of their food plant Persoonia levis.

External links
Australian Faunal Directory

Moths of Australia
Moths described in 1893
Palaephatidae
Taxa named by Edward Meyrick